Formshifter is the second studio album by American death metal band Allegaeon. The album was released on May 8, 2012 through Metal Blade Records. As the band did not employ a drummer during the album's production, all drum parts were handled by session musician J.P. Andrande. The album charted at no. 29 on the Top Heatseekers chart.

Release
The first song to be released from the album was "Tartessos: The Hidden Xenocryst". The song's official video was uploaded to Metal Blade's YouTube channel on February 21, 2012. "Behold (God I Am)" was the second song to be released, with its lyric video premiering on May 7. The album was released the next day, on May 8. A music video was released on August 31 for the song "A Path Disclosed".

Track listing

Reception

Upon its release, Formshifter has received generally positive reviews.

About.com reviewer Andrew Kapper gave the album 4 out of 5 stars, saying "there is never a flat moment on the LP" and commending Ezra Haynes's vocals along with the guitar work. AllMusic reviewer Gregory Heaney gave the album 3.5 out of 5 stars, comparing the album to At the Gates and Arch Enemy and calling the album a "nonstop riff-fest". Chronicles of Chaos gave the album a 7 out of 10 and said the album's tracks increase in terms of quality, making the first three tracks "seem like a year old inconvenience".

Personnel
 Ezra Haynes – lead vocals
 Greg Burgess – lead guitar, classical guitar
 Ryan Glisan – rhythm guitar
 Corey Archuleta – bass, backing vocals
 J.P. Andrande – drums

Additional personnel
 Daniel Castleman – Engineer, mastering, mixing
 Elmo Arteaga – Assistant engineer
 Collin Marks – Artwork
 Donovan Roubsouay – photography
 Brian J. Ames – layout

Charts

References

Allegaeon albums
2012 albums
Metal Blade Records albums